Yachting World is a monthly English language magazine published since 1894. Owned by Future plc, it features articles on sailing and yachting, specialising in ocean and offshore cruising and racing events and techniques. It is published in the UK, but has an international readership, with some 65% of readers outside the UK.

The editor is Helen Fretter.

References

External links
 Official website

Monthly magazines published in the United Kingdom
Sports magazines published in the United Kingdom
English-language magazines
Magazines established in 1894
Sailing magazines